Miss Bonaire is a national beauty pageant in Bonaire.

History
Traditionally, Miss Bonaire sends its winners at Miss Universe in 1967 to 1999. In 1973 to 1983, the winner of the Miss Bonaire pageant competed at Miss Intercontinental. Since the 2000s, the municipality did not compete at some international pageants. In 2010, the municipality declared to return at the international pageants.

Disallowed in Miss Universe
Since 2010, the Netherlands proclaimed Bonaire as a municipality of the Kingdom of the Netherlands. The Miss Universe 
Organization confirmed that the municipality is only allowed to compete at Miss Nederland and will not go to Miss Universe anymore. If the winner of the Miss Bonaire was crowned as Miss Nederland, she may compete in Miss Universe as "Miss Universe Netherlands".

Titleholders
Color key

Miss Bonaire
Since then the official winner of Miss Bonaire represented her country at the Miss Universe pageant. On occasion, when the winner does not qualify (due to age) for either contest, a runner-up is sent. The last representative of Bonaire at the pageant was in 1999. Now, the winner competes in the Miss World.

Miss International Bonaire

References

External links
Official website

Entertainment events in Bonaire
Bonaire
Bonaire
Recurring events established in 1967
Dutch awards
1967 establishments in Bonaire